The EZRide shuttle is a bus service run by the Charles River Transportation Management Association, a nonprofit organization.  It operates from North Station in Boston, Massachusetts to Fort Washington/Cambridgeport via Lechmere, Kendall Square, and University Park at MIT, serving over 25 identified stops.

Buses are operated by Paul Revere Transportation. Service runs from North Station to Cambridgeport at rush hour and from Kendall/MIT station to Cambridgeport during midday. There is no night or weekend service. Real-time predicted arrival information is available through NextBus and smartphone apps. Route maps are available on the buses, at some stops, and online.

Major stops

References

External links 
CRTMA - EZRide Shuttle

Bus transportation in the Boston area
Transportation in Cambridge, Massachusetts